Airplane mode (also known as aeroplane mode,  flight mode, offline mode, or standalone mode) is a setting available on smartphones and other portable devices. When activated, this mode suspends the device's radio-frequency (RF) signal transmission technologies (i.e., Bluetooth, telephony and Wi-Fi), effectively disabling all analog voice, and digital data services, when implemented correctly by the electronic device software author. When cellular phones became prevalent in the 1990s, some communication headsets of aircraft pilots would register an audible click when a cellular phone on the aircraft would transceive a signal. This clicking on the headsets became overwhelmingly distracting to airframe control, with more and more phone calls from airplane passengers as time went on. This led to the banning of electronic device use on airplanes and ushered in the era of airplane mode. This airplane travel condition diverged cellular network device development from hardware to software and the smart phone was created. 

The mode is so named because most airlines prohibit the use of equipment that transmit RF signals while in flight. Typically, it is not possible to make phone calls or send messages in airplane mode, but some smartphones allow calls to emergency services. Most devices allow continued use of email clients and other mobile apps to write text or email messages. Messages are stored in memory to transmit later, once airplane mode is disabled.

Wi-Fi and Bluetooth can be enabled separately while the device is in a pseudo-airplane mode, as allowed by the operator of the aircraft. Receiving RF signals (as by radio receivers and satellite navigation services) may not be inhibited by airplane mode; however, both transmitters and receivers are needed to receive calls and messages, even when not responding to them.

Since a device's transmitters are shut down when in airplane mode, the mode reduces power consumption and increases battery life.

Legal status in various nations

 Europe: On December 9, 2013, the European Aviation Safety Agency updated its guidelines on portable electronic devices (PEDs), allowing them to be used throughout the whole flight as long as they are set in Airplane mode.In November 2022, EU announced its plans to enable 5G usage in airplanes using picocell, letting users make and receive calls and messages, and use data just as they would on the ground.
 China: Prior to September 2017, cell phones, even with airplane mode, were never allowed to be used during the flight although other devices can be used while in cruising altitude. On September 18, 2017, the Civil Aviation Authority of China relaxed these rules and allowed all Chinese air carriers to allow the use of Portable Electronic Devices (PEDs) for the entire flight as long as they are in Aeroplane Mode. 
 India: On April 23, 2014, the Directorate General of Civil Aviation (DGCA) amended the rule which bans use of portable electronic devices and allowing their usage in all phases of flight.
 United States: In a revised review in October 2013, the United States Federal Aviation Administration (FAA) made a recommendation on the use of electronic devices in "airplane mode"—cellular telephony must be disabled, while Wi-Fi may be used if the carrier offers it. Short-range transmission such as Bluetooth is  permissible on aircraft that can tolerate it. The statement cites the common practice of aircraft operators whose aircraft can tolerate use of these personal electronic devices, but use may still be prohibited on some models of aircraft.

See Also
Mobile phones on aircraft
Picocell

References

External links

Avionics
Mobile phones